The men's 200 metre freestyle competition at the 1991 Pan Pacific Swimming Championships took place on August 22 at the Kinsmen Sports Center.  The last champion was Doug Gjertsen of US.

This race consisted of four lengths of the pool, all in freestyle.

Records
Prior to this competition, the existing world and Pan Pacific records were as follows:

Results
All times are in minutes and seconds.

Heats
The first round was held on August 22.

B Final 
The B final was held on August 22.

A Final 
The A final was held on August 22.

References

1991 Pan Pacific Swimming Championships